George Horatio Derby (April 3, 1823 – May 15, 1861) was an early California humorist.  He attended West Point with Ulysses S. Grant. Derby used the pseudonym "John P. Squibob" and its variants "John Phoenix" and "Squibob."  Derby served as a lieutenant in the U.S. Army Corps of Topographical Engineers.  In his spare time, he wrote humorous anecdotes and burlesques, often under the guise of his pseudonyms.

Biography 
George Derby was born 1823 in Dedham, Massachusetts, son of John B. and Mary Townsend Derby. His father deserted the family mercantile business to be a poet, spending the family's money on self publishing. George Derby graduated from the Phillips Academy in 1838 and from West Point in 1846. He first served in the Mexican–American War at Vera Cruz and Cerro Gordo. According to the newly (2010) published Autobiography of Mark Twain, Vol. One, Ulysses S. Grant was a classmate of "Squibob's" and the General told Twain some stories of Squibob at West Point.  However, according to the 1969 edition of "Register of Graduates and Former Cadets of the United States Military Academy," although their times at the academy overlapped by a year, Grant and Derby were not actually classmates.

In 1853, Derby arrived in the small outpost of San Diego, California, to begin mapping the region and developing plans for redirecting the San Diego River from the marshy delta of San Diego Bay and directly into the Pacific Ocean. This was to avoid floods that periodically silted up the bay and made use of the bay by ships difficult or impossible.

Derby married Mary A. Coons on January 14, 1854, in San Francisco. His wife's family were wary of Derby because his erratic, flippant manner infuriated his superiors. Coons tricked Derby into marrying her by placing a notice in the San Francisco paper stating that she would depart with her mother back home to St. Louis, Missouri, although she had no intention to do so. Derby read the notice and immediately took a steamer from San Diego to marry her. They had two daughters, Daisy Peyton, born 1854 in San Francisco, who married William Murray Black, and Mary Townsend, born 1858 in Mobile, who did not marry; and one son, George McClellan, born 1856, aboard American ship in Pacific, who married Bessie Kidder. Derby family lore states that George H. and the ship captain exchanged pocketwatches in celebration of the birth of George M. aboard the ship. 

While waiting for approval of his San Diego River diversion plans, he had some time on his hands. He supplemented his low military pay by contributing humorous articles to the San Francisco Herald,  California Pioneer  magazine, and the fledgling local newspaper, the San Diego Herald. He wrote articles that poked fun at the figures and pretenses of high society.  These articles were written to appear as if a running narrative from John Phoenix and were the state's first published humor. When another writer started writing articles with his pen name Squibob in a competing San Francisco newspaper, Derby wrote an article "killing off" Squibob and continued to write with a new penname, John Phoenix.

In 1855, Derby bought the Herald, which went out of business in 1860. During this time he was promoted to first lieutenant.

In 1857 Derby had amaurosis (today, some historians think he had a brain tumor), which prevented him from reading or writing. He requested leave from the Topographical Engineers in 1859 and moved to New York, where he died shortly after the start of the American Civil War.

Derby was initially buried in his wife's family plot at Bellefontaine Cemetery in St. Louis, but was reinterred at the West Point Cemetery on January 31, 1889.

In honor of George Derby and his contribution to the lighter, more irreverent side of California history, the local chapter of the organization E Clampus Vitus is named in his honor, using his pseudonym John P. Squibob.

Quotes
 One of our Fort Yuma men died, and unfortunately went to hell. He wasn't there one day before he telegraphed for his blankets.
 It rains incessantly twenty-six hours a day for seventeen months of the year [speaking of Oregon and Washington Territory]
 "Antidote for Fleas" (from Phoenixiana):
Boil a quart of tar until it becomes quite thin. Remove the clothing, and before the tar becomes perfectly cool, with a broad flat brush, apply a thin, smooth coating to the entire surface of the body and limbs. While the tar remains soft the flea becomes entangled in its tenacious folds, and is rendered perfectly harmless; but it will soon form a hard, smooth coating, entirely impervious to his bite. Should the coating crack at the knee or elbow joints, it is merely necessary to retouch it slightly at those places. The whole coat should be removed every three or four weeks. This remedy is sure, and, having the advantage of simplicity and economy, should be generally known.

See also 
 John Phoenix, Esq., The Veritable Squibob. A Life of Captain George H. Derby, U.S.A. by George R. Stewart (1937)
 Squibob, An Early California Humorist by Richard D. Reynolds (1990) Squibob Press, Inc. San Francisco, CA.  (case),  (pbk.)

References

External links 
 George Derby biography
 Phoenixiana; or, sketches and burlesques (1903) by George Derby. Reprint of original 1856 book. Contains Derby's pieces as "Professor John Phoenixiana" and "Squibob," poking fun at topics such as military surveyors and explorers, and contains several travel accounts. (American Memory, Library of Congress)
 
 "'Phoenix' Revisited: Another Look at George Horatio Derby", The Journal of San Diego History 26:2 (1980) by Canice G. Ciruzzi
 "The Journalism of Old San Diego", History of San Diego (1907-09), part 2, chapter 8
 "The Journalism of Old San Diego", History of San Diego (1907-09), part 2, chapter 8 contains a biography and several quotations
 E Clampus Vitus Squibob Chapter "Clampers" chapter was named after Derby's first penname
 Some George Horatio Derby stories are read in Mister Ron's Basement Podcast
 'The Squibob Papers'by George Horatio Derby (1865) 247 pages of previously uncollected cartoons & satires published posthumously by his widow now available thru Google Books
 George Horatio Derby, Phoenixiana; or, sketches and burlesques, D. Appleton and Company, New York, 1856 - now available thru Google Books
 

1823 births
1861 deaths
Phillips Academy alumni
United States Military Academy alumni
Military personnel from Dedham, Massachusetts
United States Army officers
United States Army personnel of the Mexican–American War
19th-century American male writers
19th-century American newspaper publishers (people)
19th-century American journalists
Writers from Dedham, Massachusetts
Writers from San Diego
American male journalists
Journalists from California
Burials at West Point Cemetery